Jean-Baptiste Rolland (2 January 1815 – 22 March 1888) was a Canadian printer, bookseller, businessman, and politician.

Born in Verchères, Lower Canada, the son of Pierre Rolland and Euphrasine Donay, his family moved to Saint-Hyacinthe in 1828. In 1832, Rolland moved to Montreal where he worked as an apprentice typographer. In 1836, he worked as a journeyman for a Montreal newspaper. He later co-founded the printing firm of Rolland and Thompson and in 1843 decided to open a book shop in Montreal. He also printed and bound books. In 1859, he formed a partnership with his eldest son, Jean-Damien Rolland, and the firm was called J.-B. Rolland et Fils. His other sons would also join the partnership. In 1881, they decided to manufacture their own paper and opened a paper mill called the Rolland Paper Company (now a division of Cascades inc.).

In 1861, he was elected to the Montreal City Council for the East Ward and served until 1867. He was re-elected in 1871 and served until 1875. He was called to the Senate of Canada in 1887 for the senatorial division of Mille Isles on the advice of Prime Minister John A. Macdonald. A Conservative, he served barely five months until his death in 1888. His son-in-law was Raymond Préfontaine.

References
 
 

1815 births
1888 deaths
Canadian senators from Quebec
Conservative Party of Canada (1867–1942) senators
Montreal city councillors
Pre-Confederation Canadian businesspeople
People from Verchères, Quebec
Burials at Notre Dame des Neiges Cemetery